St Mary's Roman Catholic Church, officially, St Mary of the Presentation Church, is a heritage-listed Roman Catholic church at 13 Church Street, Mudgee, Mid-Western Regional Council, New South Wales, Australia. It was added to the New South Wales State Heritage Register on 2 April 1999.

History 

The church was first built in 1857, when local priest Father Callaghan McCarthy had built a church, sanctuary and sacristy. It was effectively rebuilt by between 1873 and 1876 to the design of Edward Gell, with Tambaroora contractor Mr. Webb and Bathurst stonemason Mr. Burns carrying out the work. The new design incorporated the pre-existing sanctuary and sacristy in the redevelopment while constructing the body of the current church. The foundation stone of the rebuilt church was laid on 7 December 1873 and it formally opened on 11 November 1876. The spire was added to the tower in 1911.

Description 

St Mary's Roman Catholic Church is a sandstone church in Victorian Ecclesiastical Gothic designed by Bathurst country architect, Edward Gell. It has an especially fine western facade with pointed arched doorway and side recesses and narrowly pointed stained glass windows. Beautifully scaled rose window in stone and stained glass. The church has a tower with flared copper spire balanced in a symmetrical composition with gable end of southern aisle. The side elevation features repeating pointed arched stained glass windows.

The church organ was built in 1866 by J. W. Walker of London for St Jude's Anglican Church, Randwick. Under direction of Charles Richardson, in 1907 the organ was transferred from Randwick to Mudgee with a new set of pipes to the old specification. Richardson also decorated the display pipes in his style, and other alterations included the fitting of a new keyboard, the addition of a tremulant, and the removal of the hand-blowing apparatus.

Heritage listing 
St Mary's Roman Catholic Church is a fine church from the post-gold rush era, making a significant contribution to the character of the central area of Mudgee.

St Mary's Roman Catholic Church was listed on the New South Wales State Heritage Register on 2 April 1999.

Gallery

See also 

 List of Roman Catholic churches in New South Wales

References

Bibliography

Attribution

External links 

 

Mudgee
Mudgee, New South Wales
Roman Catholic churches in New South Wales
Articles incorporating text from the New South Wales State Heritage Register
Roman Catholic churches completed in 1876
1876 establishments in Australia
Victorian architecture in New South Wales
Gothic Revival architecture in New South Wales
Gothic Revival church buildings in Australia
Sandstone churches in Australia
19th-century Roman Catholic church buildings in Australia